The 2014 Dally M Awards were presented on Monday 29 September 2014 at Sydney's Star Casino. Broadcast on Fox Sports, the awards ceremony was hosted by Matthew Johns. They are the official annual awards of the National Rugby League and are named after Dally Messenger. The Dally M Medal was awarded to Jarryd Hayne and Johnathan Thurston in a tie of votes, making it the first time for the medal to be awarded to joint winners.

Judges
The 13 judges for the 2014 Dally M's were:

Fox Sports:  Greg Alexander, Gary Belcher and Ben Ikin

Channel 9:  Brad Fittler, Andrew Johns and Wally Lewis

Sky NZ:  Daryl Halligan

The Daily Telegraph:  Paul Crawley, Paul Kent, Josh Massoud, Dean Ritchie, Barry Toohey and Nick Walshaw

Dally M Medal

Dally M Awards
The Dally M Awards are, as usual, conducted at the close of the regular season and hence do not take games played in the finals series into account. The Dally M Medal is for the official player of the year while the Provan-Summons Medal is for the fans' of "people's choice" player of the year. 

Team of the Year

Presenters
 Russell Crowe
 Gary Sweet
 Lisa Wilkinson
 Wally Lewis
 Jessica Fox
 Cate Campbell
 Bronte Campbell
 Sally Pearson
 Matthew Johns
 Arthur Summons
 Braith Anasta
 Jodi Gordon
 Paul Whittaker

Cronulla-Sutherland Sharks controversy
Each of the players implicated in the Cronulla-Sutherland Sharks supplements scandal were banned from attending, or receiving awards at the 2014 Dally M Awards ceremony in September as a result of the investigation into the club's supplements scandal; captain Paul Gallen was also ruled ineligible for the Brad Fittler Medal for being the best performed New South Wales player during their victorious State of Origin series campaign.

See also
Dally M Awards
Dally M Medal
2014 NRL season

References

2014 sports awards
2014 NRL season
2014